Båvrojávrre is a lake that lies on the border between Norway and Sweden. Most of the  lake lies in Norway in Narvik Municipality in Nordland county. Only  of the lake lies in Sweden in Gällivare Municipality in Norrbotten County. The lake Baugevatnet lies just to the north. The ending -jávrre is the Lule Sami word for lake.

See also
 List of lakes in Norway
 Geography of Norway

References

Narvik
Lakes of Nordland
Lapland (Sweden)
Norway–Sweden border
International lakes of Europe
Lakes of Norrbotten County